Belton is a village and civil parish in the Isle of Axholme area of North Lincolnshire, England. To the north of Belton is the town of Crowle; to the south, the town of Epworth.

Belton parish boundaries include the hamlets of Beltoft, Sandtoft, Churchtown, Bracon, Carrhouse, Mosswood, Grey Green and Westgate. Within the parish is the now dispersed country house estate of Temple Belwood. Hirst Priory at Sandtoft still stands.

According to the 1991 Census, Belton had a population of 2,549, increasing to 2,968 at the 2011 census.

Church
Belton Grade I listed  Anglican church is dedicated to All Saints. The church is of perpendicular style. Within its chancel chapel is a 14th-century tomb, supposed to be that of Sir Richard de Belwood.

Sandtoft
Sandtoft was granted to the abbey of St Mary's York, c. 1150, by Roger de Mowbray, for the use of a single monk. By 1241, it had become a separate monastic cell, later annexed by the larger cell of St Mary Magdalene, Lincoln.

RAF Sandtoft, a former RAF Bomber Command airfield, closed in 1955 and has since been converted to other use, including for Sandtoft Airfield which is home to Sandtoft Flying School.  The Trolleybus Museum at Sandtoft, the largest trolleybus museum in Europe, is located on part of the site of the former air base.

Hirst and Temple Belwood
Grade II listed Hirst Priory is on or near the site of a monastic cell at Hirst. In the early 12th century the lands for the cell were granted by Nigel d'Albini to the Austin canons of Nostell Priory. The cell, which was extant until the 16th century, housed a single canon to oversee the priory's property and tithes. The house was built in the 18th century, with later additions in the 19th.

The land once belonged to the Knights Templar of Balsall, Warwickshire.

Transport 
The M180 runs east west to the north of the village.

The Axholme Joint Railway formerly ran north south through the village.

An Ordnance Survey map from the 1920s shows an agricultural tramway network running around North Moor, to the north of Temple Belwood, linking to the railway at Hagg Lane siding. As well as use on farms, such lines were also used for peat extraction in this area, as on the nearby Thorne and Hatfield Moors, often using WW1 trench railway equipment.

Amenities 
Belton has a small primary school that has been in existence since 1869, and two public houses.

References

External links

History of Belton
An Isle of Axholme website

Villages in the Borough of North Lincolnshire
Civil parishes in Lincolnshire